Indonesian National Route 8 is a road in the national route system that completely lies in the Central Java province, and links an area called Gumillir, North Cilacap, Cilacap, to the town of Purwokerto.

Route
Purwokerto - Patikraja - Rawalo -  - Maos- Kesugihan - Slarang - Gumilir

References

Indonesian National Routes
Transport in West Java